Claudio von Planta (born 16 September 1962) is a Swiss cameraman, director and filmmaker, based in London.

Projects

Long Way Round
His best known work is as the cameraman who accompanied Ewan McGregor and Charley Boorman on their Long Way Round motorcycle journey eastward from London to New York in 2004, Long Way Down from Scotland to South Africa in 2007, and Long Way Up from Ushuaia to Los Angeles in 2019.

Shortly before the 2004 trip von Planta discovered his motorbike licence was invalid for the journey. He subsequently failed his bike test the day before the team was due to leave. He remained in London and retook the test two weeks later, eventually flying out to join up with the team in Prague, the capital of the Czech Republic.

Von Planta would often ride far ahead of the other two in order to film them going past, or trail behind getting the shots he wanted. He suffered a couple of bad falls on the journey. At one point in Mongolia his bike took such a battering it had to be sent ahead for repairs and a replacement bike was purchased by McGregor and Boorman.

In 2006, he linked up again with Russ Malkin and Charley Boorman as the director of photography for Race to Dakar, a documentary chronicling the team's attempt at the Dakar Rally. In 2007, he reprised his role as cameraman on Long Way Down. He would again suffer an accident on the trip, coming off and damaging the bodywork on his bike after narrowly avoiding Boorman who was rapidly slowing down on a motorway in South Africa. In 2019, he joined Ewan, Charley, Russ, and David once again for Long Way Up, riding from the southern tip of South America, all the way through Central America, to Los Angeles.

Racing Green
Racing Green Endurance (RGE) was a student-led project at Imperial College London to demonstrate the potential of zero emission cars. The team drove 136 day  down the Pan-American Highway starting from north Alaska in July 2010 to Argentina in an open-top electric sportscar, which was filmed by von Planta as eight 22 minute episodes for the BBC World News channel.

Other career 
After leaving the Swiss Army in 1982, von Planta studied politics at the University of Zurich. He sold his first film in 1985 and has continued to build his portfolio of work since then. He has filmed in locations as diverse as war zones, terrorist training camps and the Pfizer UK marketing conference. He spent a month in prison in Pakistan for crossing the border illegally. He related a brief version of the story on the DVD release of Long Way Round while discussing the inability of the Swiss embassy to help their citizens.

In October 2007, he filmed Hull Freedom Trail, a  road journey from Hull, England to Freetown, Sierra Leone undertaken by a group of five 4x4 vehicles. The vehicles were to be donated to charity projects working in Freetown to reunite families torn apart by the years of civil war in the country, and attempting to raise awareness of modern slavery/human trafficking issues.

Filmography 

Chasing the Jet Stream
Racing Green Endurance
By Any Means
Commando Chaplains
Young Entrepreneur Awards 2008
Hull Freedom Trail
British Army TV Adverts
Long Way Down
Forced Repatriation
Alcohol Smuggling into Iran
Words of Warriors
Blood on the Stone
The Thin Blue Line (Documentary)
Himalayan Expedition
Guns for Hire - Congo DRC
UNICEF Stop Aids Campaign
Guns for Hire - Afghanistan
Neils Excellent Adventure
Pakistan on the Tightrope
Living with Aids
Rape Trade
Right to the Edge: Sydney to Tokyo By Any Means
Surviving Sudan (Living with Refugees)
Long Way Round
Saddam's Legacy
War Widows
Fighting by the Rules
Saddam's Secret Time-Bomb
The Saudi Tapes
The Cuba Connection
Karzan's Brothers - Escape from the Safe Haven
Rebels of the Forgotten World
Minefield Casualty
African Railway
Long Way Up

References

External links 
 
 
 

1962 births
Living people
Swiss documentary filmmakers
Swiss cinematographers
Long-distance motorcycle riders
Motorcycling mass media people
Claudio